Mevar Kumar Jamatia is an Tipra Indian Politician from Tripura. He is the former Minister of Tribal Welfare and Forest  in Biplab Kumar Deb ministry. He became the MLA from Asharambari Constituency by defeating CPI(M) candidate  Aghore Debbarma by a margin of 6,987 votes.

References 

Year of birth missing (living people)
Living people
Tripura MLAs 2018–2023
State cabinet ministers of Tripura
Indigenous Peoples Front of Tripura politicians